The 2008 Sundance Film Festival ran from January 17, 2008 to January 27 in Park City, Utah. It was the 24th iteration of the Sundance Film Festival. The opening night film was In Bruges and the closing night film was CSNY Déjà Vu.

Films
Out of 2,021 U.S. and 1,603 international feature-length films submitted for consideration, 121 were selected to be shown at the festival.

For a list of films that were shown at the festival, see List of films at the 2008 Sundance Film Festival.

Award winners
Grand Jury Prize: Documentary - Trouble the Water
Grand Jury Prize: Dramatic - Frozen River
Grand Jury Prize: World Cinema Documentary - Man On Wire
Grand Jury Prize: World Cinema Dramatic - The King of Ping Pong (Ping Pongkingen)
Audience Award: Documentary - Fields of Fuel
Audience Award: Dramatic - The Wackness
World Cinema Audience Award: Documentary - Man on Wire
World Cinema Audience Award: Dramatic - Captain Abu Raed
Directing Award: Documentary - American Teen
Directing Award: Dramatic - Ballast
World Cinema Directing Award: Documentary - Durakovo: The Village of Fools (Durakovo: Le Village Des Fous)
World Cinema Directing Award: Dramatic - Mermaid (Rusalka)
Waldo Salt Screenwriting Award - Sleep Dealer
World Cinema Screenwriting Award - I Always Wanted to Be a Gangster (J'ai Toujours Rêvé d'Être un Gangster)
Documentary Editing Award - Roman Polanski: Wanted and Desired
World Cinema Documentary Editing Award - The Art Star and the Sudanese Twins
Excellence in Cinematography Award: Documentary - Patti Smith: Dream of Life
Excellence in Cinematography Award: Dramatic - Ballast
World Cinema Cinematography Award: Documentary  - Recycle
World Cinema Cinematography Award: Dramatic - The King of Ping Pong (Ping Pongkingen)
World Cinema Special Jury Prize: Dramatic - Blue Eyelids (Párpados Azules)
Special Jury Prize: Documentary - The Greatest Silence: Rape in the Congo
Special Jury Prize: Dramatic, The Spirit of Independence - Anywhere, USA
Special Jury Prize: Dramatic, Work by an Ensemble Cast - Choke
Jury Prize in Short Filmmaking - My Olympic Summer
Jury Prize in Short Filmmaking - Sikumi (On the Ice)
International Jury Prize in International Short Filmmaking - Soft
Honorable Mention in Short Filmmaking - Aquarium
Honorable Mention in Short Filmmaking - August 15th
Honorable Mention in Short Filmmaking - La Corona (The Crown)
Honorable Mention in Short Filmmaking - Oiran Lyrics
Honorable Mention in Short Filmmaking - Spider
Honorable Mention in Short Filmmaking - Suspension
Honorable Mention in Short Filmmaking - W.
2008 Alfred P. Sloan Prize - Sleep Dealer

Juries
The juries at the Sundance Film Festival are responsible for determining the Jury Prize winners in each category and to award Special Jury Prizes as they see fit.

Jury, Independent Film Competition: Dramatic
 Marcia Gay Harden, Mary Harron, Diego Luna, Sandra Oh and Quentin Tarantino

Jury, Independent Film Competition: Documentary
 Michelle Byrd, Heidi Ewing, Eugene Jarecki, Steven Okazaki and Annie Sundberg

Jury, World Cinema Competition: Dramatic
 Shunji Iwai, Lucrecia Martel and Jan Schuette

Jury, World Cinema Competition: Documentary
 Amir Bar-Lev, Leena Pasanen and Ilda Santiago

Jury, Shorts Competition
 Jon Bloom, Melonie Diaz and Jason Reitman

Alfred P. Sloan Feature Film Prize Jury
 Alan Alda, Michael Polish, Evan Schwartz, Benedict Schwegler and John Underkoffler

Festival Theaters
 Kimball Junction
 Redstone Cinemas - 185 seats
 Ogden
 Peery's Egyptian Theatre - 800 seats
 Park City
 Eccles Theatre - 1,270 seats
 Egyptian Theatre - 266 seats
 Holiday Village Cinemas I - 156 seats 
 Holiday Village Cinemas II - 156 seats 
 Holiday Village Cinemas III - 156 seats 
 Holiday Village Cinemas IV - 164 seats 
 Library Center Theatre - 448 seats
 Prospector Square Theatre - 332 seats
 Racquet Club Theatre - 602 seats
 Yarrow Hotel Theatre 1 - 250 seats
 Yarrow Hotel Theatre 2 - 80 seats
 Salt Lake City
 Broadway Centre Cinemas IV  - 211 seats
 Broadway Centre Cinemas V - 238 seats
 Broadway Centre Cinemas VI - 274 seats
 Rose Wagner Performing Arts Center - 485 seats
 Tower Theatre - 342 seats
 Sundance Resort
 Sundance Institute Screening Room - 164 seats

References

External links
Festival webpage
 
2008 Sundance Film Festival Tips
Films sold at the 2008 Sundance Film Festival

2008
2008 in Utah
2008 film festivals
2008 in American cinema
2008 festivals in the United States
January 2008 events in the United States